Never Even Told Me Her Name is a song by Bournemouth-based band Air Traffic taken from their debut album, Fractured Life, released on 2 July 2007. It was the first song from the band to be added to the influential BBC Radio 1 playlist, where it was added to the 1-Up-front playlist, as well as being crowned "Hottest Record In The World" AND "Single Of The Week" by Radio 1's Zane Lowe. It was released as an EP along with 3 other songs from the album on 30 October 2006, as the band's first release with EMI Records. "Time Goes By" is found on the EP as an acoustic version, and would later be re-recorded with the full band for the album. One of these tracks, a demo named "Shooting Star", would later be re-recorded and re-released as a single on 18 June 2007.

The artwork for the EP was designed by the band, and photographed in the Recording Studio where they were currently recording their debut album, Fractured Life, in Rockfield Studio, Monmouth, Wales.

Due to being an EP, "Never Even Told Me Her Name" was ineligible to enter the UK Top 40. It was released as a CD, download, and limited edition, numbered double 7" vinyl.

Track listings

CD (B000JBWUQW)
"Never Even Told Me Her Name" (2:42)
"Get In Line" (2:05)
"Time Goes By (acoustic)" (2:48)
"Shooting Star (demo)" (4:00)

2006 EPs